Under the Sun of Rome is a 1948 Italian drama film directed by Renato Castellani. It was the first film of Castellani's Italian neorealism trilogy about poor people, followed by È primavera... in 1949 and Cannes Film Festival Palme d'Or winner Two Cents Worth of Hope in 1952.

Cast
 Oscar Blando as Ciro
 Liliana Mancini as Iris
 Francesco Golisano as Geppa
 Ennio Fabeni as Bruno
 Alfredo Locatelli as Nerone
 Gaetano Chiurazzi as Bellicapelli
 Anselmo Di Biagio as Dottorino
 Ferruccio Tozzi as Ciro's father
 Maria Tozzi as Ciro's mother
 Giuseppina Fava as Janitor
 Raffaele Caporilli as 'Mbriaschini
 Ilario Malaschini as Pirata
 Omero Paoloni as Coccolone
 Gisella Monaldi as Tosca
 Alberto Sordi as Fernando
 Luigi Valentini as Romoletto
 Panaccioni as Panaccioni
 Angelo Giacometti as cameriere
 Lorenzo di Marco as contadino

References

External links
 

1948 films
1948 drama films
Social realism in film
Italian black-and-white films
1940s Italian-language films
Films scored by Nino Rota
Films directed by Renato Castellani
Films set in Rome
Films shot in Rome
Italian drama films
1940s Italian films